UFC 26: Ultimate Field of Dreams was a mixed martial arts event held by the Ultimate Fighting Championship on June 9, 2000, in Cedar Rapids, Iowa.

History
The main card featured Welterweight Champion Pat Miletich defending his title against John Alessio, and Heavyweight Champion Kevin Randleman defending his title against Pedro Rizzo. The Heavyweight Championship bout was first scheduled to take place at UFC 24, but was rescheduled due to a backstage accident involving Kevin Randleman, who slipped and fell on the concrete floor, sustaining a concussion.

A bantamweight division was added at UFC 26 for fighters under 155 pounds; Jens Pulver defeated Joao Roque in the first ever UFC bantamweight bout. Lightweight was now 155-169.9 pounds, Middleweight 170-199.9 pounds, and Heavyweight 200+ pounds. This was the fourth event to feature now-regular referee, Mario Yamasaki in addition to "Big" John McCarthy.

UFC 26 featured the second appearance of Matt Hughes in the UFC, who would go on to dominate the welterweight division. The event also marked the second UFC appearance of British fighter Ian Freeman, whose preliminary bout was shown on the live pay per view broadcast.

UFC 26 was the fourth straight UFC event to have never received a home video or DVD release in the United States, as the UFC's parent company SEG was incurring financial difficulties, and would eventually sell the company to Zuffa just six months later.  Zuffa eventually released UFC 26 on DVD as part of an anthology collection of UFC 21-30.

Results

See also 
 Ultimate Fighting Championship
 List of UFC champions
 List of UFC events
 2000 in UFC

External links
UFC 26 fights reviews
Official UFC website

Ultimate Fighting Championship events
2000 in mixed martial arts
Mixed martial arts in Iowa
Sports in Cedar Rapids, Iowa
2000 in sports in Iowa